McDonald & Dodds is a British television crime drama series, based in the English city of Bath, that stars Tala Gouveia and Jason Watkins as mismatched detectives, DCI Lauren McDonald & DS Dodds. Created and principally written by screenwriter Robert Murphy, the series follows streetwise ex-London cop McDonald, as she arrives in Bath to head up the local CID, and is partnered with Dodds, a shy, modest cop who hasn't seen street action in over ten years.

Originally commissioned under the working title Invisible, a pair of films were shot during the summer of 2019, which make up the basis of the first series. Strong viewing figures saw a second series commissioned for 2021. A third series was later confirmed and was broadcast in 2022.

Production
The first series featured a stellar line-up of guest stars, including renowned actors Robert Lindsay, Hugh Dennis, Freddie Fox and Joanna Scanlan. The second series, which began in February 2021, was again headed by an all-star guest cast, led by Rob Brydon, whose role was used to heavily promote the series in the run-up to its broadcast.

The final episode of the second series, The War of the Rose, was made available to watch on BritBox services outside of the UK. By June 2022, the episode had still not been broadcast in the UK, despite having been released on DVD in Germany, Australia and the United States. Subsequently, it was announced that the episode would instead air as if it were the third episode of Series 3 in the UK. Due to the casting changes between series, running this episode third in series 3 would have created a continuity problem, so it was decided to reshoot James Murray's scenes with Claire Skinner instead. This means there are two versions of the episode in circulation: the 'international' version with James Murray as the Chief Super, and the 'UK' version with Claire Skinner as the Chief Super.

Filming on the third series took place in late 2021, with Claire Skinner joining the cast as Chief Superintendent Mary Ormond, following the departure of James Murray. Guest stars announced for this series include Alan Davies, Sian Phillips, Paul McGann and Kelvin Fletcher.

Cast
Tala Gouveia as DCI Lauren McDonald
Jason Watkins as DS Dodds
James Murray as Chief Superintendent John Houseman (Series 1–2)
Claire Skinner as Chief Superintendent Mary Ormond (Series 3)
Jack Riddiford as DC Darren Craig (Series 1–2)
Pearl Chanda as DC Laura Simpson (Series 1)
Danyal Ismail as DC Martin Malik (Series 3)
Lily Sacofsky as DC Milena Paciorkowski (Series 2–3)
Charlie Chambers as DC Samuel Goldie (Series 3)

Episodes

Series 1 (2020)

Series 2 (2021)
 The War of the Rose was originally intended to be Series 2’s finale, featuring the final appearances of James Murray as Ch. Supt. Houseman and Jack Riddiford as DC Darren Craig. However in the UK due to a scheduling conflict, the episode was moved to late on in Series 3, meaning some scenes had to be reshot with the new characters for the purposes of continuity.

Series 3 (2022)

Home media
All three series have been released onto Region 2 DVD in the UK. Further releases have taken place of the first and second series in France and Germany.

References

External links

2020s British mystery television series
2020s British crime drama television series
2020 British television series debuts
English-language television shows
ITV crime dramas
Television series by Mammoth Screen
Television series by ITV Studios
Television shows filmed in the United Kingdom
Television shows set in Somerset
British crime television series